James John Drury (August 15, 1835 – December 25, 1919) was an Irish soldier who fought in the American Civil War. Drury received the United States' highest award for bravery during combat, the Medal of Honor, for his action during the Battle of Jerusalem Plank Road in Virginia on June 23, 1864. He was honored with the award on January 18, 1893.

Biography
Drury was born in Limerick, Ireland, on August 15, 1835. He joined the 4th Vermont Infantry in August 1861, and mustered out with his regiment in July 1865. He died on December 25, 1919, and his remains are interred at the Lovilia Cemetery in Lovilia, Iowa.

Medal of Honor citation

See also

List of American Civil War Medal of Honor recipients: A–F

References

External links
 

1835 births
1919 deaths
Military personnel from County Limerick
Irish-born Medal of Honor recipients
People of Vermont in the American Civil War
Union Army officers
United States Army Medal of Honor recipients
American Civil War recipients of the Medal of Honor